Edaphosauridae is a family of mostly large (up to 3 meters or more) Late Carboniferous to Early Permian synapsids. Edaphosaur fossils are so far known only from North America and Europe.

Characteristics
They were the earliest known herbivorous amniotes and, along with the Diadectidae, the earliest known herbivorous tetrapods. The head is small in relation to the bulky body, and there is a tall sail along the back, which may have functioned as a thermoregulatory device.

Classification
The interrelationships of Edaphosauridae was investigated in details by David M. Mazierski and Robert R. Reisz (2010). The cladogram below is modified after their phylogenetic analysis.

Below is a cladogram modified from the analysis of Benson (in press):

References 

 Carroll, R. L. (1988), Vertebrate Paleontology and Evolution, WH Freeman & Co.
 Reisz, R. R., 1986, Handbuch der Paläoherpetologie – Encyclopedia of Paleoherpetology, Part 17A Pelycosauria Verlag Dr. Friedrich Pfeil,

External links
 Edaphosauridae

 
Pennsylvanian first appearances
Taxa named by Edward Drinker Cope
Prehistoric synapsid families